Mordellistena errans is a beetle in the genus Mordellistena of the family Mordellidae. It was described in 1907 by Fall.

References

errans
Beetles described in 1907